Dholaikhal is a historic neighborhood in Old Dhaka. It is 550 sq yards and borders Bahadur Shah Park and Tipu Sultan road.

History
Dholaikhal is named after an early 15th century canal built by Islam Khan I, the Mughal Subahdar of Bengal and who moved the capital of Bengal to Dhaka. The canal was for both defense and navigation. There was a bridge over the canal connecting Farashganj to Gendaria. Over time trash was dumped in the canal, clogging it, and the canal was made into an underground sewage line in some parts. Dholaikhal is a commercial area with many shops, mostly specializing in car parts, and metal workshops.

References 

Old Dhaka
Neighbourhoods in Dhaka